Let George Do It is a 1938 comedy starring popular stage comedian George Wallace. It was the first of two films Wallace made for Ken G. Hall at Cinesound Productions, the other one being Gone to the Dogs (1939). Hall later called Wallace "in my opinion, easily the best comedian that this country has produced."

Synopsis
The plot concerns a man, Joe Blake, who works as a stage hand in a vaudeville theatre headlined by Mysto the magician. When he finds out that the girl he is in love with, Molly, is getting married, he gets drunk with his friend Happy Morgan and decides to commit suicide. Joe offers to leave all his possessions to a gangster, Zilch, if Zilch will arrange a painless death for Joe.

The next day Joe finds out he has received an inheritance and wants to live, but Zilch and his men, including Unk, abduct Joe and demand half his money. Joe escapes with the help of Clara, a woman who has a crush on him, resulting in a wild speedboat chase across Sydney harbour.

Cast
George Wallace as Joe Blake
Gwen Munro as Molly
Harry Abdy as Elmer Zilch
Letty Craydon as Clara
Alec Kellaway as Mysto the Great
Joe Valli as 'Happy' Morgan
Neil Carlton as John Randall
George Lloyd as Unk

Production
Stuart F. Doyle signed George Wallace to a contract with Cinesound in February 1937. It was originally announced that he would be making Gone to the Dogs, set against a background of greyhound racing. That turned out to be Wallace's second Cinesound movie; this was the first.

As with most Cinesound comedies of the late 1930s, Hall employed a team of comedy writers to help with the script along with credited screenwriters Wallace and Frank Harvey. This consisted of Hall, cartoonist Jimmy Bancks, Bill Maloney and Hal Carleton. The story followed a formula developed in Wallace's Ticket in Tatts: "George is given a simple labourer's job... Quite innocently is fired...  He then becomes involved in a simple wish-fulfilment device... the device is complicated by an equally simple set of stereotyped gangsters who have no motivation beyond innate greed for greater wealth, and in each situation they are foiled, usually accidentally, by George and his friends."

The male romantic lead was played by Neil Carlton, a Melbourne-born actor who had appeared in films in England. "I've been searching for a juvenile of Carlton's type ever since I have been directing", said Hall during production. "He's handsome, a good actor, and possesses a fine singing voice; stands 6 ft 1 in. in his socks, weighs 14 St., and is a splendid all-round athlete."

Filming commenced on 30 January 1938 and finished on 22 March. During the shooting of a speedboat chase scene on Sydney Harbour, the boat crashed into a racing eight near Double Bay, cutting it in half and injuring three rowers.

There were several musical numbers which demonstrated Wallace's ability to sing and dance. A water ballet, choreographed by Leon Kellaway, brother of Cecil Kellaway, was shot but was mostly cut in the interests of keeping the film at a fast pace.

Release
Hall later wrote that the two films he made with Wallace "were very substantial hits". Variety wrote "it broke records everywhere."

The famous tenor Richard Tauber saw the movie when touring Australia.

It was released in Britain in 1940 as In the Nick of Time, to avoid confusion with the 1940 George Formby film Let George Do It!.

References

External links
Let George Do It in the Internet Movie Database
Let George Do It at Australian Screen Online
Let George Do It at Oz Movies
Review of film at Variety

1938 films
Films directed by Ken G. Hall
Australian black-and-white films
Australian comedy films
1938 comedy films
1930s Australian films
1930s English-language films
Cinesound Productions films